Anna-Maria Müller (later Murach, 23 February 1949 – 23 August 2009) was an East German luger who competed in the late 1960s and early 1970s. She won the gold medal in the women's singles event at the 1972 Winter Olympics in Sapporo. At the previous Winter Olympics in Grenoble, she initially finished second after the competition was halted to three runs due to bad weather, but was disqualified with her East German teammates Ortrun Enderlein and Angela Knösel (who was fourth) when it was discovered that they had illegally heated their runners (which are used to guide the luge on the ice as it maneuvers down the track). Enderlein, who was leading at the time, and Müller were stripped of their respective medals as a result.

Upon her Olympic victory in Sapporo, Müller explained that she enjoyed luge because it "...provided a harmonius counterbalance to my work as a pharmacist."

Müller also won a silver medal at the 1969 FIL World Luge Championships in Königssee, West Germany, as well as two medals at the FIL European Luge Championships: a gold in 1970 and a bronze in 1972.

References

External links

 

Kluge, Volker. (2000). Das große Lexikon der DDR-Sportler. Berlin: Schwarzkopf & Schwarzkopf. 

Wallenchinsky, David. (1984). "Luge: Women's Singles". In The Complete Book the Olympics: 1896–1980. New York: Penguin Books. p. 577.

1949 births
2009 deaths
People from Friedrichroda
German female lugers
Lugers at the 1968 Winter Olympics
Lugers at the 1972 Winter Olympics
Olympic gold medalists for East Germany
Olympic lugers of East Germany
Olympic medalists in luge
Sportspeople from Thuringia
Recipients of the Patriotic Order of Merit
Medalists at the 1972 Winter Olympics